The East Quartzite Range is a mountain range,  long, forming a subordinate southwest unit of the King Range, in the Concord Mountains of Victoria Land, Antarctica. It was named by the Northern Party of the New Zealand Federated Mountain Clubs Antarctic Expedition  (NZFMCAE), 1962–63, after the distinctive geological formation of the feature. These topographical features lie situated on the Pennell Coast, a portion of Antarctica lying between Cape Williams and Cape Adare.

References 

Mountain ranges of Victoria Land
Pennell Coast